Caroline Castigliano (c.1960 -) is a British fashion designer, noted for her elegant timeless classic wedding and evening wear dress ranges, the Caroline Castigliano Collection.  
In her early twenties she set up a business in Florida, 'Survival Kit', designing sportswear for women, which was sold in Macy's, Bloomingdales and Saks.

In 1990, she returned to the UK and opened a bespoke bridalwear retail business and in the mid nineties worked with Jasper Conran. In 1996 she launched her first high end bridal dress collection.

As of 2016, Castigliano has a prestigious showroom located in Knightsbridge, London and a unique dedicated production facility in Lincolnshire (UK). Dresses are sold via specialist stockists throughout the world.

She has featured in interviews with Brides Magazine, Wedding Magazine and Wedding TV  and featured on "How the Rich Get Hitched" which ran on Channel 4 in 2015

References

Wedding dress designers
British fashion designers
Living people
British people of Italian descent
Year of birth missing (living people)